The  Corinthian League was an English amateur football league in and around London. Formed in 1945 on the resumption of football after World War II, the league began with nine member clubs. In 1963 the league was disbanded and most clubs joined the newly formed Division One of the Athenian League.

List of champions

Member clubs
Twenty-nine clubs played in the league during its existence:

Bedford Avenue
Carshalton Athletic
Chesham United
Dagenham
Dorking
Eastbourne
Edgware Town
Epsom & Ewell

Epsom Town
Erith & Belvedere
Grays Athletic
Hastings & St Leonards
Horsham
Hounslow Town
Leatherhead

Letchworth Town
London Fire Forces
Maidenhead United
Maidstone United
Slough Town
Tilbury
Twickenham

Uxbridge
Walton & Hersham
Wembley
Windsor & Eton
Wokingham Town
Worthing
Yiewsley

See also
List of Corinthian League (football) seasons

References

 
Athenian League
Defunct football leagues in England